Sabotsy Manjakavahoaka is a rural municipality in Analamanga Region, in the Central Highlands of Madagascar. It belongs to the district of Andramasina and its populations numbers to 9,658 in 2019.

This municipality was established only in 2015. It covers the villages of  Ambalabe, Ambohimamory, Ambohitrandriana, Ampangabe, Mananjara, Mangabe, Sabotsy and Soavinimerina. It is situated at 50 km in the south of the capital Antananarivo.

Economy
The economy is based on substantial agriculture. The region is one of the main suppliers of foie gras in Madagascar.

References

Populated places in Analamanga

mg:Sabotsy Manjakavahoaka